New Jersey is one of the fifty U.S. states. The state is considered a stronghold of the Democratic Party and has supported the Democratic candidate in every presidential election since 1992. Democrats have also controlled both chambers of the state legislature since 2002. New Jersey currently has two Democratic United States senators. New Jersey's Class I Senate seat has been Democratic since 1959 (aside from the eight-month tenure of Nicholas F. Brady in 1982). New Jersey's Class II Senate seat has been Democratic since 1979 (aside from the four-month tenure of Jeffrey Chiesa in 2013). In addition, New Jersey's House congressional delegation has had a Democratic majority since 1965, except for a period between 1995-1999 and 2013-2017. As of July 1, 2020, there were more registered Democrats than unaffiliated voters for the first time in history, as there are more Democrats than Republicans as well.

History

American Revolution
In 1776, the first constitution of New Jersey was drafted. Written during the American Revolution, it created a basic framework for state government and allowed "all inhabitants of this Colony, of full age, who are worth fifty pounds proclamation money" to vote (including blacks, spinsters, and widows); married women could not own property under common law. The constitution declared itself temporary and void if there was reconciliation with Great Britain. Both parties in elections mocked the other party for relying on "petticoat electors", and accused each other of allowing unqualified women to vote. The state voted for Washington in 1789 and 1792, as well as Adams in 1796.

Nineteenth century
The second version of the constitution was adopted on June 29, 1844, and restricted suffrage to white males. Important components of the second state constitution included the separation of powers among the executive, legislative, and judicial branches. The new constitution also provided a bill of rights, and granted voters (instead of the legislature) the right to elect the governor. Throughout the century, the state voted for the Federalist Party twice, the Democratic-Republican Party five times, the National Republican Party once, the Whig Party four times, the Democratic Party ten times, and the Republican Party three times.

Twentieth century
From 1894 to 1973, Republicans usually controlled both houses of the state legislature (with the exceptions of 1907, 1911, 1913–1914, 1932, 1937, 1958–1963, 1966–1967). From 1900 to 1944, New Jersey voted for Democrats five times, and voted for Republicans seven times. After World War II, New Jersey was a Republican-leaning swing state in presidential elections; from the 1948 to the 1988, Republican candidates won nine out of eleven elections. John F. Kennedy won New Jersey in 1960 by 22,000 votes, and Lyndon B. Johnson won in 1964 as a part of his landslide victory. Although New Jersey had several highly populated Democratic urban areas such as Camden, Newark, and Jersey City, the state was also becoming home to suburbs of New York City and Philadelphia. Voters in suburban New Jersey were overwhelmingly white, and more likely to vote Republican. From 1943 to 1979, New Jersey was represented in the US Senate by a Democrat and a Republican.

Since 1992, New Jersey has voted for Democrats in every presidential election. Bill Clinton won a plurality of New Jersey's popular vote that year, and a majority of New Jersey's popular vote in 1996. Among Republican New Jersey voters, those living in rural parts of the state tended to vote for conservative Republicans; suburban voters tended to prefer liberal, or moderate, Republicans. During the 1980s, a significant number of Asian-Americans immigrated to the northeastern and central parts of the state and tended to vote Democratic.

Twenty-first century

Since 2002, the New Jersey Legislature has been overwhelmingly Democratic; in April 2020, there were over 994,000 more registered Democrats than Republicans. Democrats tend to do well in areas near New York City, Philadelphia, and Trenton, and cities such as Jersey City, Newark, Camden, Elizabeth, Trenton, Paterson are  overwhelmingly Democratic. These cities influence counties (such as Hudson, Essex, Camden, Union, Mercer, and Passaic to vote Democratic. Predominantly suburban and rural counties, especially along the Jersey Shore and northwestern New Jersey, tend to vote Republican; this includes counties such as Ocean, Warren, Cape May and Hunterdon. Other counties, such as Atlantic, Morris, Cumberland, are considered "swing" counties; they tend to vote closely within the margins of each party, swaying in one direction or the other.

Statistics 
The 2016 presidential election in New Jersey was won by Democrat Hillary Clinton in 12 counties, while Republican Donald Trump won nine counties; overall, Clinton carried the state with a vote percentage of 55.45 to 41.35 percent. Trump won two counties (Gloucester and Salem) which had voted Democratic in 2012. Every county voted identically in 2016 and the 2017 gubernatorial election with the exception of Gloucester, which flipped back to Democratic. In the 2018 Senate election, Atlantic and Gloucester Counties flipped Republican. In the 2020 presidential election, Biden flipped Atlantic, Gloucester, and Morris counties from the 2018 elections. 

Nine counties (Burlington, Camden, Essex, Gloucester, Hudson, Mercer, Middlesex, Passaic, and Union) have a plurality of Democratic registrants, and five (Cape May, Hunterdon, Morris, Sussex, and Warren) have a plurality of Republican registrants; the remaining seven have a majority of unaffiliated voters. Of those with an unaffiliated majority, four counties have more Democrats than Republicans (Atlantic, Bergen, Cumberland and Somerset) and four counties (Monmouth, Morris, Ocean and Salem) have more Republicans than Democrats.

Two counties (Essex and Hudson) have an absolute majority of their registrants in one party (Democratic). The highest percentage of unaffiliated voters is in Cumberland at 39.4 percent. The highest percentage of Democrats is in Hudson at 54.4 percent, the highest percentage of Republicans is in Cape May at 43 percent, and the highest percentage registered in other parties is in Cumberland at 1.9 percent. The lowest percentage of unaffiliated is in Cape May at 31.1 percent, Democrats is in Ocean at 21.7 percent, Republicans is in Essex at 10.3 percent, and other parties is a tie between Essex and Hunterdon at 0.9 percent each. The county with the closest Democratic-Republican percentages spread is Salem at 0.3 percent. The county with the largest Democratic-Republican percentage spread is Hudson at 43.4 percent. Bergen County has the largest number of registered voters at 677,213, and Salem County has the least at 49,063.

Eight districts- the 1st, 3rd, 6th, 8th, 9th, 10th, 11th and 12th- have a majority of Democratic registrants, and zero have a majority of Republican registrants; the remaining four have a majority of unaffiliated voters. Of those with an unaffiliated majority, three districts have more Republicans than Democrats- 2nd, 4th, and 7th- and one district- the 5th- has more Democrats than Republicans.

Districts 8 and 10 have an absolute majority of their registrants in one party (Democratic). The highest percentage of unaffiliated voters is in District 4 at 38.9 percent. The highest percentage of Democrats is in District 10 at 55.5 percent; the highest percentage of Republicans is in District 4 at 36.8 percent, and the highest percentage registered in other parties is a tie between District 2, District 6, District 8, and District 9 at 1.4 percent each. The lowest percentage of unaffiliated is in District 8 at 34.1 percent, Democrats is in District 4 at 22.9 percent, Republicans is in District 10 at 8.1 percent, and other parties is in District 11 at 0.8 percent each. The district with the largest Democratic-Republican percentage spread is District 10 at 47.4 percent. The district with the smallest Democratic-Republican percentage spread is District 2 at 0.9 percent. District 7 has the largest number of registered voters at 619,375 and District 8 has the least at 403,953.

New Jersey's Federal Representation

Following each decennial census, the New Jersey Redistricting Commission forms to realign the districts. New Jersey currently has 12 House districts In the 118th Congress, 9 of New Jersey's seats are held by Democrats and 3 are held by Republicans. There are as follows:

New Jersey's 1st congressional district represented by Donald Norcross (D)
New Jersey's 2nd congressional district represented by Jeff Van Drew (R)
New Jersey's 3rd congressional district represented by Andy Kim (D)
New Jersey's 4th congressional district represented by Chris Smith (R)
New Jersey's 5th congressional district represented by Josh Gottheimer (D)
New Jersey's 6th congressional district represented by Frank Pallone (D)
New Jersey's 7th congressional district represented by Tom Kean Jr. (R)
New Jersey's 8th congressional district represented by Rob Menendez (D)
New Jersey's 9th congressional district represented by Bill Pascrell (D)
New Jersey's 10th congressional district represented by Donald Payne Jr. (D)
New Jersey's 11th congressional district represented by Mikie Sherrill (D)
New Jersey's 12th congressional district represented by Bonnie Watson Coleman (D)

New Jersey's two United States Senators are Democrats Bob Menendez and Cory Booker, serving since 2006 and 2013, respectively. 

New Jersey is part of the United States District Court for the District of New Jersey in the federal judiciary. The district's cases are appealed to the Philadelphia-based United States Court of Appeals for the Third Circuit.

Issues

The most contentious recent issue in New Jersey has been the conflict between the state government and public-sector unions. The unions, allied with the Democratic Party, believed that their workers were entitled to pensions and healthcare which had been promised to them in the past. Moderate Democrats and Republicans believed that the state could no longer afford to pay for benefits it had promised public workers in the past.

Property taxes are also an issue, since the state has the nation's highest property tax. New Jersey is a densely-populated, high-income, high-cost-of-living state, with more money needed for infrastructure and transportation, and it does not allow counties and municipalities to impose local income or sales taxes. Property taxes fund local government, schools and county expenses, making lowering it difficult.

Legalized gambling is also an issue. In 2011, Governor Chris Christie and Senate President Steve Sweeney promised to limit gambling to Atlantic City for "at least five years" to protect the struggling tourist destination from intrastate competition. Developers are pressuring the legislature to allow gambling in other parts of the state, such as the Meadowlands. New Jersey challenged the Professional and Amateur Sports Protection Act (PASPA) in 2014, which had grandfathered Nevada's federal statutory monopoly on legal sports betting. The Supreme Court overturned the appellate-court decision, removing the final barrier to New Jersey sports betting on May 14, 2018. Justice Samuel Alito wrote the opinion supporting New Jersey's assertion that the PASPA infringed on the state's Tenth Amendment rights in Murphy vs. Collegiate Athletic Association. The state quickly moved to capitalize on the ruling and allow sports betting at state-sanctioned sportsbooks at the Meadowlands Racetrack.

In 2010, New Jersey legalized medical cannabis. The law, legalizing the drug for medical use, was passed by a Democratic government just before Christie (who was skeptical about legalized medical marijuana) took office. Christie subsequently vetoed, or requested alterations to, laws expanding the state's program. (New Jersey has two dispensaries.) The issue gained attention during the 2013 gubernatorial election, when the father of a young girl with epilepsy confronted Christie at a diner. In March 2019, a vote on recreational legalization was canceled at the last minute. The state senate did not have the 21 votes needed to pass, since all of its Republicans and nine of its Democrats opposed the bill. A ballot measure to legalize marijuana for recreational use was on the ballot on November 3, 2020. Named Public Question 1, it passed overwhelmingly 67%-33%, with every county supporting legalization.

On October 21, 2019, weeks after California passed a similar bill, state Senators Joseph Lagana (D-Bergen) and Sandra Cunningham (D-Hudson) introduced the New Jersey Fair Play Act. The bill would allow college athletes to be paid for the use of their names, images and likeness, and to hire an agent or lawyer. It intends to protect student athletes, since one injury can cost them their scholarship without a way to pay for school or vocational guidance.

On February 4, 2019, Governor Phil Murphy signed a $15-minimum-wage bill into law. The law will increase the minimum wage by $1 every January 1 until it reaches $15 in 2024. When it was enacted, the state's minimum wage was $8.85. The first increase was on July 1, 2019 (to $10), and it will become $12 on January 1, 2021. The bill raises tipped-worker wages from $2.13 to $5.13 per hour; if a worker does not earn the minimum wage through tips, the employer must make up the difference. Farm-workers will only be raised to $12.50 an hour in 2024, then possibly raise it to $15 by 2027.

LGBT rights
In April 2004, New Jersey enacted a domestic-partnership law which is available to same- and opposite-sex couples aged 62 and over. In 2006, the Supreme Court of New Jersey ordered the state to provide the rights and benefits of marriage to gay and lesbian couples. The following year, New Jersey became the third state in the U.S. (after Connecticut and Vermont) to offer civil unions to same-sex couples. In 2013, the state supreme court ruled that New Jersey must allow same-sex couples to marry. A 2010 last-minute attempt to legalize same-sex marriage under outgoing Democratic governor failed because of objections by Senate President Steve Sweeney (also a Democrat). From 2010 to 2013, Governor Christie vetoed attempts by the state legislature to legalize same-sex marriage. Since the 2013 New Jersey Supreme Court ruling, three government-recognized relationships have been in effect in the state: domestic partnerships, civil unions, and marriage.

Gun control
New Jersey has some of the country's strictest gun control laws in the nation, which include bans on assault firearms, hollow-nose bullets, and magazines which can hold more than 10 rounds. A permit is required to purchase any firearm, including shotguns, rifles, and handguns. No gun offense in New Jersey is graded less than a felony. BB guns, air guns, black-powder guns, and slingshots are statutory weapons. New Jersey does not recognize out-of-state gun licenses, and enforces its own gun laws.

See also
Government of New Jersey
Political party strength in New Jersey
Elections in New Jersey
Law of New Jersey

Notes

References